Fostoria is an unincorporated community in Pottawatomie County, Kansas, United States. Fostoria has a post office with ZIP code 66426.

History
The first post office in Fostoria was established in 1884.

Climate
The climate in this area is characterized by hot, humid summers and generally mild to cool winters.  According to the Köppen Climate Classification system, Fostoria has a humid subtropical climate, abbreviated "Cfa" on climate maps.

Education
The community is served by Blue Valley USD 384 public school district.

References

Further reading

External links
 Pottawatomie County maps: Current, Historic, KDOT

Unincorporated communities in Pottawatomie County, Kansas
Unincorporated communities in Kansas